The Chiayi County Council (CYSCC) is the elected county council of Chiayi County, Republic of China. The council consists of 37 councilors lastly elected through the 2022 Republic of China local election on 26 November 2022.

History
The council was originally established as Chiayi City Council after the handover of Taiwan from Japan to the Republic of China in 1945. In 1950, administrative divisions of Taiwan Province were readjusted and the Chiayi County Council was subsequently established on 21 February 1951. The council moved to its current address in January 1992.

Organization
 Speaker
 Deputy Speaker
 Secretary-General
 Secretary
 Administration Office
 Council Affairs Office
 General Affairs Office
 Accounting Office
 Legal Office
 Personnel Office

Building
The council is located in a building that sits on 4.6 hectares of land. The building has a height of 24.65 meters which consists of 3 floors and 1 basement. The building was designed by Liao Jhao-kun and the construction was carried out by Sie Jian Cheng Construction Company. The groundbreaking ceremony for the building was held in April 1989 and was completed in November 1991.

Speakers and deputy speakers

Speakers
 Huang Ci-sian (1951-1953)
 Wang Guo-jhu (1953-1958)
 Liu Wang-de (1958-1961)
 Huang Lao-dah (1961-1964)
 Lin Zhen-yong (1964-1968)
 Zhang Wen-zheng (1968-1977)
 Tsai Chang-ming (1977-1982)
 Chen Min-wen (1982-1986)
 Qiu Tian-chao (1986-1994)
 Shao Deng-biao (1994-1998)
 Dong Xiang (1998-2002)
 Hou Qing-he (2002-2006)
 Yu Zheng-da (2006-2014)
 Chang Min-da (2014-now)

Vice speakers
 Wu Yuan-jia (1951-1955)
 Lin Bao (1955-1958)
 Huang Ching-jiang (1958-1961)
 Jhang Wun-Jheng (1961-1964)
 Huang Shi-yong  (1964-1968)
 Tsai Chang-ming (1968-1977)
 Liao Sheng-wei  (1977-1982)
 Qiu Zhun-nan    (1982-1986) 
 Hou Yui-huang (1986-1990)
 Siao Deng-biao (1990-1994)
 Dong Xiang (1994-1998)
 Hou Qing-he (1998-2002)
 Yu Zheng-da (2002-2006)
 Zhang Ming-da (2006-2014)
 Chen Yi-yue (2014-now)

Transportation
The council is accessible within walking distance West from Chiayi Station of Taiwan HSR.

See also
 Chiayi County Government

References

External links
 

1951 establishments in Taiwan
Chiayi County
County councils of Taiwan
Organizations established in 1951